Jou

Places 
 Jou (Murça), a parish of the municipality of Murça, Portugal
 Jou-sous-Monjou, a commune in Cantal, France
 Jou (Aveyron), a hamlet in Thérondels commune, Aveyron, France

People 
 Jou (raja) (fl. 1815), raja of Adonara, Indonesia
 Jou Silva (born 1987), Brazilian footballer
 Jou Howard, Big data and database practitioner, USA
 Zhou (surname), a Chinese surname

Other uses 
 Jō, a staff used in Japanese martial arts

See also 
 Jo (disambiguation)